The 2015–16 Adelaide United W-League season was the club's eighth season in the W-League.

Players

Squad information

Transfers in

Transfers out

Managerial staff

Squad statistics

Competitions

W-League

League table

Results summary

Results by round

Matches

Notes

References

External links
 Official Website

Adelaide United FC (A-League Women) seasons
Adelaide United